Snowboarding was featured as part of the 2007 Asian Winter Games at the Beida Lake Skiing Resort in Changchun, China. Events were held from 29 January to 30 January 2007. Japan won both gold medals in halfpipe competition, the host nation China won the remaining medals.

Schedule

Medalists

Medal table

Participating nations
A total of 29 athletes from 8 nations competed in snowboarding at the 2007 Asian Winter Games:

References
 Results

External links
 Official website

 
2007 Asian Winter Games events
2007
Asian Winter Games